Teleiopsis insignita is a moth of the family Gelechiidae. It was described by Pitkin in 1988. It is found in the Palearctic realm.

References

Moths described in 1988
Teleiopsis